2-Methyl-2-butene, 2m2b, 2-methylbut-2-ene, also beta-isoamylene is an alkene hydrocarbon with the molecular formula C5H10.

Used as a free radical scavenger in trichloromethane (chloroform) and dichloromethane (methylene chloride). It is also used to scavenge  hypochlorous acid (HOCl) in the Pinnick oxidation.

John Snow, the English physician,  experimented with it in the 1840s as an anesthetic, but stopped using it for unknown reasons.

See also
Pentene

References 

Hydrocarbons
Alkenes